Michel Juneau-Katsuya is a former senior intelligence officer and manager at the Canadian Security Intelligence Service.

Career
He started his career as a police officer with the Royal Canadian Mounted Police (RCMP) before transferring to the Canadian Security Intelligence Service (CSIS). He has performed duties as a criminal investigator, and intelligence officer in both counterintelligence and counterterrorism, and also as a strategic analyst on global and emerging issues.

In 1994, he stated that the most imminent threat to the world was not nuclear proliferation, but simple machetes - a prophecy he considers to have been fulfilled by the Rwandan genocide later.

Today he is the president and CEO of The Northgate Group, and sometimes cited in media stories as a source on international espionage.

Works
These books reveal various spy activities in Canada and share some points on how to defend its company against it.

References

Year of birth missing (living people)
Living people
Canadian Security Intelligence Service agents
Place of birth missing (living people)